The 2007 BDO Classic Canadian Open of December was held November 28 to December 2 at the Pavillon de la Jeunesse in Quebec City, Quebec. It was the second BDO Classic of the year, the first being held in January as part of the previous curling season.

Teams
The teams are listed as follows:

Round-robin standings
Final round-robin standings

Round-robin results
All draw times are listed in Eastern Standard Time.

Draw 1
Wednesday, November 28

Draw 2
Thursday, November 29

Draw 3
Thursday, November 29

Draw 4
Thursday, November 29

Draw 5
Thursday, November 29

Draw 6
Friday, November 30

Draw 7
Friday, November 30

Draw 8
Friday, November 30, 5:00 pm

Draw 9
Friday, November 30, 8:00 pm

Playoffs

Money List

References

2007-08
BDO Classic Canadian Open (December), 2007
Curling competitions in Quebec City
2007 in Quebec